Caliban are a German metalcore band from Essen. To date, they have released thirteen studio albums and two EPs, along with two split albums with Heaven Shall Burn.

History

Caliban was formed in Essen, Germany in 1997 as Never Again. In the beginning, the band consisted of vocalists Andreas Dörner and Marc Ulfig, guitarists Björn Kaiser and Marc Görtz, bassist Engin Güres and drummer Kai Kogelheide. With this lineup, a self-titled demo was recorded. After six months of playing together and several member changes – Ulfig, Kaiser and Kogelheide left, the latter were replaced by Claus Wilgenbusch and Robert Krämer – the band recorded two songs for a demo, which was never released. The songs were sent to several record labels, and Lifeforce Records was the first to offer the band – by then called Caliban – a record deal. Caliban's first self-titled EP came out in the summer of 1998. To promote it, the band played many shows all over Europe and a few support shows for bands including Morning Again, Earth Crisis and Cro-Mags.

After their European tour in 1999, Caliban entered the studio to record their first full-length entitled A Small Boy and a Grey Heaven. The CD received favorable reviews in many big magazines and many smaller hardcore and metal zines. They also released the first part of a split-CD with Heaven Shall Burn, named The Split Program.

Vent came out in April 2001. Vent was released by Imperium Records and by Howling-Bull Records in Japan. Shortly after the release, Caliban was offered the opportunity to tour Japan to play the Beast-Feast 2001 in the Yokohama Arena, sharing stage with bands including Slayer, Pantera, Machine Head, Biohazard and Morbid Angel. The Japan trip was followed by a U.S. tour with Bloodjinn, which was interrupted by the September 11 attacks.

In August 2002, Caliban recorded their third official release Shadow Hearts. This record was more melodic and harmonic than its predecessors. In 2004 the band got a record deal with Roadrunner Records in Europe (Abacus Recordings in the US) and started to record their fourth album, The Opposite from Within, alongside producer Anders Fridén, who is known for fronting In Flames.

In July 2005, the band released the second part of their split-CD with their friends from Heaven Shall Burn, called The Split Program II. The band released their fifth album called The Undying Darkness in February 2006 and toured with All Shall Perish, Bleeding Through and I Killed the Prom Queen for the "Darkness over Europe" tour.

In 2007, Caliban recorded their album The Awakening with producer Benny Richter and it was released in Germany on 25 May. The album reached 36 in the German charts.

In 2009, the band toured with German band Kreator on the "Chaos Over Europe Tour". They also signed a worldwide contract with Century Media Records. They released their new album, Say Hello to Tragedy, on 25 August 2009. This album - just like The Awakening - reached 36th place on the German media charts.
In October and November they toured Europe on the "Beastfest European Tour 2009" with Suicide Silence, German friend-band Maroon and American acts Emmure and After the Burial.

Caliban entered the studio in February and recorded a cover EP titled Coverfield, released in May 2011. The album consists of 4 songs, although more songs were recorded and may be released later. In mid August, the band entered the studio to finish writing and recording a new full-length album to be released in early 2012.
At the beginning of September the band posted a message on their official site, saying that the songwriting is complete and that 12 songs were made. The new album titled I Am Nemesis was released on 3 February.

Stormbringer Magazin of Germany Caliban is writing and recording a new full-length album for January 2014. The band released Ghost Empire on 24 January 2014 via Century Media Records. In February 2014, Caliban entered the German Media Control Charts at #7 for this album. In the beginning of 2015 they toured with Bury Tomorrow, Dream On, Dreamer and Any Given Day.

Caliban then released the album, Gravity, in the spring of 2016, and via social media teased an upcoming project in 2017. On 6 April 2018, Caliban released their eleventh album, Elements. Three years after their previous album, Caliban release a new album titled Zeitgeister on May 14, 2021. This release reunites some old tracks now sung and re-recorded in German language. Additionally, Zeitgeister includes one previously unreleased song, "nICHts". The next year on April 22, the band released their 13th full-length album, titled Dystopia.

Band members

Current members
 Andreas Dörner – lead vocals 
 Marc Görtz – lead guitar 
 Denis Schmidt – rhythm guitar, clean vocals 
 Patrick Grün – drums 

Former members
 Marc Ulfig – vocals 
 Björn Kaiser – rhythm guitar 
 Kai Kogelheide – drums 
 Engin Güres – bass 
 Claus Wilgenbusch – rhythm guitar 
 Robert Krämer – drums 
 Thomas Sielemann – rhythm guitar 
 Andreas Nikolaou – rhythm guitar 
 Boris Pracht – bass 
 Marco Schaller – bass, backing vocals 

Timeline

Discography

Studio albums

EPs

Split albums

Music videos

References

External links

Caliban at MySpace
Caliban at Roadrunner Records
Caliban at Century Media Records

1997 establishments in Germany
Century Media Records artists
German metalcore musical groups
Musical groups established in 1997
Musical quintets
Roadrunner Records artists
Abacus Recordings artists